Sumit Kalia (27 November 1987 – 8 July 2018) was an Indian cricketer. He played in two Twenty20 matches for Punjab in the 2006–07 Inter State Twenty-20 Tournament. He also played in the Indian Cricket League in 2008, and was registered for the players' auction for the 2014 Indian Premier League. He died by drowning in Govind Sagar Lake in Himachal Pradesh. He was 30 years old.

See also
 List of Punjab cricketers (India)

References

External links
 

1987 births
2018 deaths
Indian cricketers
Punjab, India cricketers
Place of birth missing
Deaths by drowning in India
Accidental deaths in India